The Oklahoma Secretary of Finance, Administration and Information Technology is a member of the Oklahoma Governor's Cabinet. The Secretary is appointed by the governor, with the consent of the Oklahoma Senate, to serve at the pleasure of the governor. The secretary serves as the chief adviser to the governor on fiscal policy, taxation, and the operations and personnel needs of the state government.

The most recent secretary was Clark Jolley, who was appointed by Governor Mary Fallin on February 28, 2018, and served in that post until January, 2019.

History
The position of Secretary of Finance was established in 1986 to provide greater oversight and coordination to the financial and revenue activities of the State government. The position was established, along with the Oklahoma State Cabinet, by the Executive Branch Reform Act of 1986. The Act directed the Secretary of Finance and Revenue to advise the Governor on financial policy and advise the state financial agencies on new policy as directed by the governor. In 2011, the Oklahoma Legislature passed the Government Administrative Process Consolidation and Reorganization Act of 2011. This consolidated the duties and responsibilities of the Oklahoma Secretary of Human Resources and Administration into those of the Finance Secretary, thereby greatly increasing the duties and authority of the position.

Oklahoma state law allows for cabinet secretaries to serve concurrently as the head of a state agency and as a cabinet secretary. Historically, the Secretary of Finance has also served as the director of the Oklahoma Office of State Finance. As of 2013, at least two secretaries have served in that dual position. Alternatively, Secretary Scott Meacham had previously served as OSF Director until he was appointed as state treasurer in 2005, though he continued to serve as secretary.

In 2018, Oklahoma Tax Commission Vice Chairman Clark Jolley became the first secretary to serve in an agency other than the Office of State Finance or its successor agency, the Office of Management and Enterprise Services.

Responsibilities
The Secretary of Finance, Administration and Information Technology is responsible for the overseeing the formation of the Oklahoma state budget, developing fiscal policy and for determining taxation policy. Additionally, the position is responsible for oversee the State's financial market through the regulation of financial institutions, consumer credit, and securities. The secretary is one of the central positions within the state government as it is responsible for overseeing government-wide spending and public debt management. The secretary is also responsible for overseeing the State employee pension programs. The secretary is also responsible for providing services to help manage and support the basic functioning of all state agencies. These services included personnel management, central purchasing, state motor pool management, building maintenance and construction, as well as central printing and mailing.

As of fiscal year 2017, the Secretary of Finance, Administration and Revenue oversees 2998 full-time employees and is responsible for an annual budget of $938,273,144.63 (not including assets of the retirement systems, which increases the overall oversight to closer to $31,550,000,000).

Salary
The annual salary of the Secretary of Finance, Administration and Information Technology is set by law at $90,000. Despite this law, if the secretary serves as the head of state agency, the secretary receives the higher of the two salaries. Since incumbent Secretary Clark Jolley also serves as the Vice Chairman of the Oklahoma Tax Commission, he receives the salary allowed for that position. As of 2018, the annual salary for that position is set at $131,000.

Agencies overseen
The Secretary of Finance, Administration and Information Technology oversees the following state entities:

 All numbers represent fiscal year Fiscal Year 2017 levels

List of Secretaries

References

External links
Office of the State Treasurer website

Finance
Finance and Revene